The Ralph Avenue station was a station on the demolished BMT Fulton Street Line in Brooklyn, New York City. It had 2 tracks and 2 side platforms. It was opened on September 20, 1888, and served by trains of the BMT Fulton Street Line. It also had a connection to the trolley lines of the same name. Ralph Avenue was the easternmost station on the line until it was expanded to Rockaway Avenue on November 16, 1888. Less than a month later Saratoga Avenue would replace Ralph Avenue as the penultimate station on the line. The next stop to the east was Saratoga Avenue. The next stop to the west was Utica Avenue. 

In 1936, the Independent Subway System built their own Fulton Street subway and added an underground subway station with the same name. The el station became obsolete, and it closed on May 31, 1940.

References

Defunct BMT Fulton Street Line stations
Railway stations in the United States opened in 1888
Railway stations closed in 1940
Former elevated and subway stations in Brooklyn